Robert Paton Bryce (7 July 1879 – 24 September 1958) was  a former Australian rules footballer who played with South Melbourne and Collingwood in the Victorian Football League (VFL).

Notes

External links 

Bob Bryce's profile at Collingwood Forever

1879 births
1958 deaths
VFL/AFL players born outside Australia
Australian rules footballers from Victoria (Australia)
Sydney Swans players
Collingwood Football Club players